Pseudoceros bicolor, known as the two-colored flatworm,  is a rare species of polycladid flatworm.

Reproduction 
Two-colored flatworms have a simultaneous hermaphrodite quality that display hypodermic insemination, the reproductive mode of some organisms whereby gametes are passed to a mate by puncturing the body wall and injecting gametes.

Distribution and habitat 
Two-colored flatworms are found in Indian River Lagoon, Bird Island, Bermuda, Bocas del Toro, Panama, Curaçao, the Florida Keys, Santa Marta, Colombia, South Water Caye, and Belize. They prefer living in areas with coral rubble, which are full of life.

Diet 
Two-colored flatworms are predators. They prey on colonial ascidians.

Turbellaria
Animals described in 1901